Debeljak is a surname. It may refer to:

Aleš Debeljak (1961–2016), Slovenian cultural critic, poet and essayist
Erica Johnson Debeljak (born 1961), American-Slovenian writer and translator
Greg Debeljak, American football player and coach
Tine Debeljak (1903–1989), Slovenian literary critic, translator, editor and poet
Vid Debeljak (born 1994); Slovenian canoeist

Slovene-language surnames